Lyudmila Lysenko (born 2 November 1973) is a Belarusian biathlete. She competed at the 1994 Winter Olympics and the 2002 Winter Olympics.

References

External links
 

1973 births
Living people
Biathletes at the 1994 Winter Olympics
Biathletes at the 2002 Winter Olympics
Belarusian female biathletes
Olympic biathletes of Belarus
Place of birth missing (living people)